Rajesh Tulshidas Patnekar (born 23 September 1963) is an Indian politician and member of the Bharatiya Janata Party. Patnekar was member of the Goa Legislative Assembly from the Bicholim constituency in North Goa.  He was re-elected as an MLA in the 2017 Vidhan Sabha Election.

He previously held the seat from 2002-2007 and 2007–2012. He has served as the chairman of the Khadi village and industries board, Govt. of Goa. As a member of Goa Legislative Assembly, he was Chairman Of the public accounts committee, and member of various other committees of the Legislature.

Personal life 
His wife Aruna Patnekar is a high school teacher in St. Mary's Convent High School, Mapusa.

References 

People from North Goa district
Bharatiya Janata Party politicians from Goa
Members of the Goa Legislative Assembly
Living people
Indian National Congress politicians from Goa
Goa MLAs 2017–2022
1963 births